George William Moulds (born 2 November 1983) is an English cricketer.  Moulds is a right-handed batsman who bowls right-arm medium-fast.  He was born at Derby, Derbyshire.

Moulds represented the Derbyshire Cricket Board in 2 List A cricket matches.  These came against Wiltshire and Cambridgeshire in the 2001 Cheltenham & Gloucester Trophy.  In his 2 List A matches, he scored 18 runs at a batting average of 18.00, with a high score of 18, while in the field he also took a single catch.  With the ball he took 3 wickets at a bowling average of 15.66, with best figures of 2/19.

Moulds currently plays club cricket for Ilkeston Rutland Cricket Club in the Derbyshire Premier Cricket League.

References

External links
George Moulds at Cricinfo
George Moulds at CricketArchive

1983 births
Living people
Cricketers from Derby
English cricketers
Derbyshire Cricket Board cricketers